Piotr Jacek Krzywicki (born 22 October 1964, Poddębice; died 9 December 2009, Łódź) was a Polish politician. From 1998 to 2001, he served on Łódź's city council.

He was elected to the Sejm on 25 September 2005, winning 19944 votes in Łódź's 9th district, representing the Law and Justice party until 5 November 2007, when he switched political parties, joining Polish Plus, where he would remain until his death in 2009.

Krzywicki graduated from law school at the University of Łódź. He was also a member of Sejm 2001-2005.

Death
He died on 9 December 2009, aged 45, from  pancreatic cancer.

See also
 Members of Polish Sejm 2005-2007

References

External links
 Piotr Krzywicki - parliamentary page - includes declarations of interest, voting record, and transcripts of speeches
 Biodata (Polish language)

1964 births
2009 deaths
Deaths from pancreatic cancer
Deaths from cancer in Poland
Members of the Polish Sejm 2005–2007
Members of the Polish Sejm 2001–2005
Law and Justice politicians
Politicians from Łódź
People from Poddębice County
Councillors in Łódź
Members of the Polish Sejm 2007–2011